Clarence J. Taylor (1894 – September 24, 1988) was chief justice of the Idaho Supreme Court from 1949 to 1968.

Taylor received his J.D. from the University of Idaho College of Law in 1919. He practice law in Rexburg, Idaho, and shortly became the county prosecutor of Madison County, Idaho.

He served as a state district court judge in Idaho Falls for 20 years prior to his appointment to the state supreme court.

Taylor died at his home in Boise, Idaho, at the age of 94.

References

1894 births
1988 deaths
University of Idaho College of Law alumni
Justices of the Idaho Supreme Court